Rob Stevenson is an American music executive and currently Partner at the New York, New York-based 300 Entertainment. Over the course of his career, he has been involved in the development of artists including The Killers, Katy Perry, The Decemberists, Gotye, Post Malone, and others.

Advanced Alternative Media and The Sunday Service
After leaving the corporate advertising world as an account manager at Ogilvy & Mather, Stevenson joined Advanced Alternative Media as the Head of College Marketing. Envisioning and launching the first-ever independent music distribution network for college radio, he quickly immersed himself within the fabric of the business. His distribution network, The Sunday Service still exists today.

Island Def Jam
In 1998, Stevenson began a nine-year stint at Island Def Jam Music Group in A&R. While at Island Def Jam, he found, signed, and guided the careers of some of the biggest names in rock, alternative, and pop including The Killers, Fall Out Boy, Sum 41, and more. He also orchestrated the label's partnership with Sony Pictures for the successful Spider-Man soundtrack in 2002. He oversaw and helped deliver seven multiplatinum and five gold albums that notched a total of 9 Grammy nominations, 15 MTV VMA nominations with 5 wins, 2 American Music Award nominations with 1 win. Entertainment Weekly dubbed him the "Must A&R Guy" on the magazine's 2006 "Must List", while New York Magazine awarded him “The Industry Award” in their 2005 Pop Culture Awards Issue.

Notable artists

 The Killers
 Fall Out Boy
 Sum 41
 Lady Sovereign
 The Bravery
 Thrice

Virgin Records America
Virgin Records America sought him out in 2008 and brought him on board as President of A&R. While overseeing Artist & Repertoire operations at Virgin, he signed the resurrected Seattle legends Alice In Chains, paving the way for their gold-selling comeback Black Gives Way to Blue. While in the EMI Group, he, along the A&R team, worked on Katy Perry's multi-platinum-selling Teenage Dream, which produced a record-setting five #1 singles.  Other notable projects included Beastie Boys' final studio effort Hot Sauce Committee Parts 1 & 2, and releases from Thirty Seconds to Mars and The Decemberists.

Notable artists

 Katy Perry
 Alice In Chains
 Beastie Boys
 Thirty Seconds to Mars
 The Decemberists

Republic Records
Attracted to the cutting-edge ethos of Republic Records, he became a part of the label's family in 2011 as Executive Vice President of A&R. Stevenson signed Gotye, whose "Somebody That I Used to Know" [featuring Kimbra] became the top-selling song of 2012, selling over 6.8 million digital downloads. “Somebody That I Used to Know” then went on to receive Grammy Awards for Best Pop Song by a Duo or Group and Record of the Year. The album Making Mirrors won the Grammy for Best Alternative album.

Stevenson spearheaded label efforts to bring Iceland’s Of Monsters and Men and Canada’s The Weeknd to the label.  Of Monster and Men's debut album is platinum-certified and the "Little Talks" digital single went platinum in 2012.  The Weeknd’s debut, Trilogy, is triple platinum and the single “Wicked Games” also sold over three million.

In 2016, Stevenson, along with A&R team member Tyler Arnold  signed Post Malone to Republic. Post Malone’s Stoney went on to sell three million copies, and Beerbongs & Bentleys has sold two million. His singles, “Rockstar” and “Better Now” had over a billion-plus streams, with the latter reaching #7 on the Billboard Hot 100, and “Psycho” hitting #1 on that chart.

Notable Artists

 Jessie J
 Gotye
 Of Monsters and Men
 The Weeknd
 Phantogram
 AFI
 James Bay
 Post Malone
 Amine
 Glass Animals

Casablanca Records
In addition to attracting new artists to Republic, Stevenson oversaw the re-launch and reinvention of Casablanca Records. Known as the soundtrack to nightlife in the 1970s, the label  quickly was established as the soundtrack to club life in the 2010s with a roster that included Tiesto, Avicii, Alesso, Martin Garrix, C2C, Kavinsky,  Bingo Players and Duck Sauce.

300 Entertainment
In December 2020, Stevenson joined 300 Entertainment as Partner, reuniting with his former Island Def Jam Music Group associates, who created the company. This included co-founder and CEO Kevin Liles, as well as Lyor Cohen (the latter leaving the company to become YouTube’s Global Head of Music).
At 300 Entertainment, an independent company with a focus on digital and streaming distribution, Stevenson oversees development of the artist roster, digital distribution, and publishing.

Education
Stevenson received his bachelor's degree in marketing from the Fairfield University Dolan School of Business in 1992.

References

A&R people
American music industry executives
Fairfield University Dolan School of Business alumni
Living people
Place of birth missing (living people)
1970 births